The 1944 Palestine Wartime Cup (HaGavia HaMilhamti) was a special edition of the Palestine Cup, intended to be a standalone cup competition and not an Israel State Cup edition. However, the IFA recognize the title as part of the main competition.

Draw for the competition was held on 5 February 1944, without the participation of Beitar teams, which withdrew from the competition in protest over the EIFA treatment of Beitar Tel Aviv after the team's match against NSC Cairo in the previous summer.

Cup matches began on 20 February 1944, but delays caused the final to be played almost a year later, on 13 January 1945. In the final, Hapoel Tel Aviv had beaten Hapoel Petah Tikva 1–0.

Results

First round

Second round

Replay

Quarter-final

Replay

Semi-finals

Final

Notes

References
100 Years of Football 1906-2006, Elisha Shohat (Israel), 2006

Israel State Cup
Cup
Cup
Israel State Cup seasons